= David Keezer =

American electrical engineer

- Education: University of California, Berkeley; California Institute of Technology; Carnegie Mellon University; Florida Institute of Technology
- Occupation: Electrical engineer

David Keezer is an American electrical engineer. He is a professor in the department of electrical and computer engineering at the Georgia Tech.

In 2010, Keezer was named a fellow of the Institute of Electrical and Electronics Engineers, "for contributions to high-speed digital test technology".
